The Early Days of Kiss (also referred to officially as the Club Tour) was a series of performances by American rock band, Kiss. During this time, Kiss hired Bill Aucoin as their manager, and were then signed to Casablanca Records.

History
The first Kiss performance took place on January 30, 1973, for an audience of fewer than ten people at the Popcorn Pub (renamed Coventry shortly afterward) in Queens. The band were paid $50 for performing two sets that evening, following a cold-call Simmons had made to the venue, convincing them to hire the new band for a three-night stand.

When the band performed at the Daisy in Amityville, Simmons recalled that it was "a drinking club, with cheap beer and a biker crowd", while Stanley remembered the Daisy being "no better than the size of a living room".

To give their performances a presence, the band would use fake Marshall amplifiers on stage with hollow cabinets to make the music seem louder than it was.

From October to November, the band recorded their self-titled debut album, which was released on February 18, 1974. The December 22 show at Coventry in Queens is the earliest filmed live performance by Kiss as described in Kissology Volume 1 and Volume 3. During the New Year's Eve show at The Academy of Music in New York City as an opening act for Blue Öyster Cult, Simmons accidentally set his hair ablaze while performing his fire-breathing routine.

Reception
Fred Kirby of Variety who had attended the June and August performances, had given the band a positive review, citing that the band "outshine most of the others in clean, pulsating rock and roll, high in volume and excitement". He pointed out the unrelenting and solid set, as well as praising Gene as a 'theatrical plus'. Kirby concluded his review with stating that the music catches hold and never lets go. 
He would note that Kiss had drawn good crowds and were building a local following.

Stanley Mises, a local New York Sunday News reviewer who attended the Coventry performances, cited that the show was more complex and the music was "loud, loud, loud" but fairly simple. He would state that the members looked like "Lance Loud on a nightmarish blender".

Chris Charlesworth of Melody Maker, who attended the December 31, 1973 performance, praised the band's performance, music and costumes. He pointed out the music, saying it was "loud and heavy, simple riff-based rock and roll with a steady funky beat". Concluding his review, he noted the climax as "brash and spectacular" as well as pointing out the fire breathing incident during 'Firehouse'.

A reviewer from Billboard who attended the January 26, 1974 performance at the Academy of Music, noted on the band's embrace to touring after having performed at various local clubs for a year. The show was given a positive review with their set cited as being ear shattering, as well as the heavy reliance on special effects.

Setlist

Songs Played Overall
"Deuce"
"Cold Gin"
"Nothin' to Lose"
"Strutter"
"Watchin' You"
"Love Her All I Can"
"She"
"Firehouse"
"Keep Me Waiting" (Wicked Lester cover)
"Want You Beside Me" ("Life in the Woods") (Wicked Lester cover)
"Simple Type" (Wicked Lester cover)
"Baby, Let Me Go" ("Let Me Go Rock 'N' Roll")
"Sunday Driver" ("Let Me Know")
"Acrobat" ("Love Theme from Kiss")
"100,000 Years"
"Black Diamond"
Encore
"Go Now" (The Moody Blues cover)

Typical Setlist
"Deuce"
"Cold Gin"
"Nothin' to Lose"
"Strutter"
"Watchin' You"
"Love Her All I Can"
"She"
"Firehouse"
"Simple Type" (Wicked Lester cover)
"Baby, Let Me Go" ("Let Me Go Rock 'N' Roll")
"Sunday Driver" ("Let Me Know")
"100,000 Years"
"Black Diamond"

Tour dates

Support act key:
† Headliner
‡ Opening/supporting act

Personnel
Paul Stanley – vocals, rhythm guitar
Gene Simmons – vocals, bass
Peter Criss – drums, vocals
Ace Frehley – lead guitar, backing vocals

References

Citations

Sources

1973 concert tours
1974 concert tours
Kiss (band) concert tours